The University Club of Montreal is a private social club in Montreal, Quebec. The club was conceived in December 1906 as a gentlemen's club intended for university graduates, and was incorporated on 8 November 1907. Since 1988 it has been a mixed-sex club.

History 
Its building was completed around 1912, and is known as "University Club" or as Édifice du Club-Universitaire-de-Montréal.

The building, completed in 1913, was designed by Percy Erskine Nobbs, an architect noted for his Arts and Crafts work.

The building was registered as a monument historiques du Quebec on September 29, 1986.

In late 2017, the club was in the process of giving up its historic building.

See also 

 List of gentlemen's clubs in Canada

References

External links
 

Buildings and structures in Montreal
Heritage buildings of Quebec
Gentlemen's clubs in Canada
Organizations established in 1906
1906 establishments in Quebec